Alshinard Harris (born December 7, 1974) is a former NFL cornerback and current coach. Harris played for fourteen seasons in the National Football League (NFL) from 1998 to 2011. He is currently an assistant secondary coach for the Dallas Cowboys. Harris played for the Tampa Bay Buccaneers, Philadelphia Eagles, Green Bay Packers, Miami Dolphins, and St. Louis Rams.  He was selected for the Pro Bowl after his 2007 and 2008 seasons in Green Bay. The AP also named him a second-team All-Pro in 2007.

Harris was known throughout the league for his physical, bump and run coverage style and was also known for his long, stringy dreadlocks, influencing others in the NFL. He was drafted by the Tampa Bay Buccaneers in the sixth round of the 1997 NFL Draft. He played college football at Texas A&M-Kingsville.

College career
Harris spent two seasons (1993–94) at Trinity Valley Community College in Athens, Texas where he was a member of the 1994 national championship team.  He then transferred to Texas A&M University-Kingsville where he was a two-year starter and letterman (1995–96).  Harris was a first-team All-Lone Star Conference pick in 1996.

Professional career

Tampa Bay Buccaneers
Harris was drafted in the sixth round of the 1997 NFL draft by the Tampa Bay Buccaneers. He spent the entire season on their practice squad. He spent the 1998 preseason with the Buccaneers, but was released on August 30.

Philadelphia Eagles
Harris was claimed off waivers by the Philadelphia Eagles on August 31, 1998. He made his NFL debut a week later against the Seattle Seahawks as the starting right cornerback in place of injured Bobby Taylor. He started seven games and played in all 16 during the 1998 season. On November 6, 2000, Harris signed a five-year contract extension with the Eagles.

Green Bay Packers
Following the 2002 season, Green Bay acquired Harris and a fourth round choice in that year's draft in exchange for the Packers' second round selection.  Harris went on to start all 32 regular season games over the next two seasons for Green Bay.

In a 2003 NFC wildcard playoff game against the Seattle Seahawks Harris returned an interception 52 yards for the game-winning touchdown 4:25 in overtime, making it the first playoff game ever to be won in overtime with a defensive touchdown. The game was memorable for Seahawks quarterback Matt Hasselbeck's ironic comment after winning the coin toss for the start of overtime, telling the microphoned referee, and thus the crowd at Lambeau Field and the national television audience, "We want the ball, and we're going to score."

In a 2004 NFC wildcard playoff game, Harris was the cornerback in primary coverage of Vikings' star wide receiver Randy Moss, who, upon catching his second touchdown of the game while being covered by Harris, famously "mooned" the crowd at Lambeau Field, an act for which Moss was fined $10,000.

In 2005, Harris only allowed one touchdown in coverage, and Harris finished the season with three sacks, ten pass deflections, and three interceptions (one for touchdown in a 52-3 win over the New Orleans Saints).

In 2006, Harris finished the season with three interceptions and 14 pass deflections.

On February 13, 2007 it was announced that Harris signed a two-year contract extension with the Packers.  The deal was an add-on to the five-year, $18.7 million extension that Harris signed in 2004, a contract that included about $7 million in guarantees.  That extension still had three seasons remaining on it, through 2009.  Financial details of the new extension were not yet available, but Harris told the Wisconsin State Journal that it included two roster bonuses totaling $4.5 million, along with some Pro Bowl incentives.

Harris played in the 2008 Pro Bowl, along with teammates Brett Favre, Chad Clifton, Donald Driver, and Aaron Kampman, as well as head coach Mike McCarthy.

Harris was originally thought to be out for the remainder of the 2008 season because of a ruptured spleen suffered during the first quarter of the game against Dallas, when he collided with fellow Green Bay Packer A.J. Hawk.  However, Harris came back to the Packers in their game against the Tennessee Titans on November 2, 2008.

On November 22, 2009 Al Harris suffered a potentially career-ending injury to the outside of his left knee in a home game against the San Francisco 49ers. Harris fell to the ground while trailing Niners wide receiver Michael Crabtree; no contact caused the injury, Harris reported his foot simply 'got caught in the ground'. Harris tore the anterior cruciate ligament, the lateral collateral ligament, the iliotibial band, the fibular collateral ligament, and the lateral hamstring. His knee was surgically reconstructed eight days later resulting in Harris spending the remainder of the season rehabilitating his knee.

Harris started the 2010 season on the ' Physically Unable to Perform (PUP)' list, then returned to practice on October 19. On November 8, 2010 Al Harris was taken off the list and waived by the Green Bay Packers. He passed through waivers unclaimed, making him a free agent. Green Bay paid Harris the pro-rated portion of his $2.5 million salary, as the team was not obligated to pay the rest even though he passed through waivers.

On Sunday, November 21, 2010, Harris took out a large advertisement in the Milwaukee Journal Sentinel, thanking Packer fans for 'always supporting (him)'. The Packers won the Super Bowl that year, and Harris received a championship ring.

Miami Dolphins
Harris signed a 1-year deal with the Miami Dolphins on November 10, 2010.  He played three games before suffering a hamstring injury and was placed on injured reserve. On December 30, 2010, the Dolphins reached an injury settlement with Harris and he was released.

St. Louis Rams
On July 29, 2011, Harris agreed to terms with the St. Louis Rams. On November 13, 2011, Harris suffered a torn ACL in his right knee during a regular season game against the Cleveland Browns and did not return to the game. The following day, November 14, 2011, Harris was placed on injured reserve.

Retirement
On May 1, 2013 Ted Thompson, Packers Executive Vice President, General Manager and Director of Football Operations, stated that Al Harris had informed the team of his decision to retire as a Green Bay Packer. When asked to comment Harris said, "Just over my career I had an awesome time, but the better part of my years were in Green Bay, (so) it was just important to me to retire as a Packer," nearly 3½ years since he played his final snap for the Packers. "I had a great experience in Philadelphia, great experience in Tampa and everywhere else I played, but Green Bay is a special place to play football." On September 2, 2021  Harris was inducted into The Packers Hall Of Fame.

Coaching career

Miami Dolphins
During the 2012 season, Harris served as a coaching intern under coach Joe Philbin for the Miami Dolphins.

Kansas City Chiefs
Harris was hired as the assistant defensive backs coach under his former head coach from his playing day with the Eagles; Andy Reid, for the Kansas City Chiefs on January 25, 2013. Following a disappointing performance by the Chiefs defense in the AFC Championship for the 2018 season, Harris, as well as the entire defensive coaching staff, was replaced.

Dallas Cowboys
In 2020 Harris was hired to work with the secondary of the Dallas Cowboys under his former head coach from his playing days with the Packers; Mike McCarthy.

NFL statistics

Stats from Pro Football Reference

References

External links
Green Bay Packers bio
Official Website of Al Harris
Kansas City Chiefs Coach bio

1974 births
Living people
American football cornerbacks
Blanche Ely High School alumni
Dallas Cowboys coaches
Green Bay Packers players
Kansas City Chiefs coaches
Miami Dolphins coaches
Miami Dolphins players
National Conference Pro Bowl players
People from Coconut Creek, Florida
People from Pompano Beach, Florida
Philadelphia Eagles players
Players of American football from Florida
St. Louis Rams players
Texas A&M–Kingsville Javelinas football players
Trinity Valley Cardinals football players
Sportspeople from Broward County, Florida